Puji Temple is a Buddhist temple located on Furong Mountain in Ningxiang City, Hunan province, China.

History 

It was established in the Yuan dynasty (1271–1368), at the time it was called Furong Temple.

During the Ming dynasty (1368–1644), it was made up of granite. In 1413, in the eleventh year of the age of Yongle (1403–1424) of Yongle Emperor (1360–1424), Yongle Emperor named it "Puji Temple".

In modern times, the temple fell into disrepair due to war. In the 21st century, the government of Qingshanqiao Town rebuilt the temple.

References

External links

14th-century Buddhist temples
Buddhist temples in Changsha
Buildings and structures in Ningxiang